
Gmina Lubiszyn is a rural gmina (administrative district) in Gorzów County, Lubusz Voivodeship, in western Poland.

Villages
Gmina Lubiszyn contains the villages and settlements of Baczyna, Brzeźno, Buszów, Chłopiny, Dzikowo, Gajewo, Jastrzębiec, Kozin, Łąkomin, Lubiszyn, Lubno, Marwice, Mystki, Podlesie, Ściechów, Ściechówek, Smoliny, Staw, Tarnów, Wysoka and Zacisze.

Neighbouring gminas
Gmina Lubiszyn is bordered by the city of Gorzów Wielkopolski and by the gminas of Bogdaniec, Dębno, Kłodawa, Myślibórz, Nowogródek Pomorski and Witnica.

Twin towns – sister cities

Gmina Lubiszyn is twinned with:
 Odervorland, Germany

References

Lubiszyn
Gorzów County